The 1998 WPA World Nine-ball Championship was a professional pool championship that took place in 1998 in Taipei City, Taiwan. The event was won by Kunihiko Takahashi who defeated defending champion Johnny Archer in the final.

Knockout stages
The following is the results from the quarter-finals. Players competing had progressed through the earlier knockout round. Players in bold denote match winners. Matches were race-to-13.

See also
 List of sporting events in Taiwan
 List of WPA World Nine-ball champions

References

External links
 Event at Propool.info

1998
WPA World Nine-ball Championship
WPA World Nine-ball Championship
International sports competitions hosted by China